You Used to Hold Me may refer to:

"You Used to Hold Me" (Ralphi Rosario song), 1987
"You Used to Hold Me" (Calvin Harris song), 2010

See also
"You Used to Hold Me So Tight" by Thelma Houston, 1984